Crassispira laevisulcata is a species of sea snail, a marine gastropod mollusk in the family Pseudomelatomidae.

Description
The shells of most species of sea snails are spirally coiled. The length of the shell varies between 13 mm and 20 mm.

Distribution
This marine species occurs off Morocco and Senegal.

References

 von Maltzan, H.F. (1883) Beiträge zur Kenntnis der senegambischen Pleurotomiden. Jahrbücher der Deutschen Malakozoologischen Gesellschaft, 10, 115–135, pl. 3.

External links
 
 Paul Pallary, Exploration Scientifique du Maroc. Deuxième fascicule. Malacologie [1912

laevisulcata
Gastropods described in 1883